Cape Classics is the largest importer of South African wines  to the United States. A privately held company founded by Andre and Gary Shearer in 1992, Cape Classics focuses on South African and French wine, today representing 30 estates and labels with distribution in 50 states.

Brands

B Vintners 
Bartinney
Bayten 
Braai 
Château du Raux  
Clos du Gaimont  
De Toren 
DeMorgenzon 
Domaine de La Réserve d'O  
Domaine Paul Buisse  
Domaine Philippe Colin  
Domaine Vincent Carême  
Domaine Vrignaud  
Excelsior  
Glenelly 
Indaba  
Jam Jar 
Kanonkop  
Le Roi des Pierres 
Lourensford
Maison Matisco 
Maison Philippe Pacalet 
Mas Janeil by François Lurton 
Mvemve Raats 
Pierre Dupond La Renjardière
Raats Family Wines
Rudi Schultz 
Terre Brûlée 
Topiary 
Vins Auvigue

Key Partners
Cape Classics has partnership with Darden Restaurants (Seasons 52, The Capital Grille, Yard House), Walt Disney World, Trader Joe's, Costco and Whole Foods Market

Awards
"Best Wine Importer" - Food & Wine magazine
"Name You Can Trust" - Food & Wine magazine's "Annual Wine Guide" for ten consecutive years

See also
South African wine
French Wine

References

External links
Buy Drinks Website

Wine retailers
Drink companies of the United States
1992 establishments in the United States